Massimiliano "Max" Ferrari (born 29 May 1971) is an Italian politician and journalist.

Biography
Ferrari was born in Varese. He joined Lega Nord party in 1989 when he was just sixteen. In the 1998 when TelePadania (the Television of Lega Nord Party) was founded he was called to lead a television program about foreign policy, after he became the director of the TG-Nord (the television journal of TelePadania) from 12 October 2002 until 10 April 2006 and in various special occasions (such as in Serbia, Palestine, Lebanon, Afghanistan, Cambodia, Laos, Vietnam and Iraq during the war) he was a freelance war reporter.

Ferrari left the Lega Nord in 2006, in order to found the separatist party named Independentist Front Lombardy (Fronte Indipendentista Lombardia), which later joined Lega Padana of Roberto Bernardelli in order to build a new autonomist lombard party Lombardia Autonoma then he ran for 2009 European Parliament election in the Pole of Autonomy list.

In April 2010 he returned in the Lega Nord of Umberto Bossi.
He's Secretary General of Lombardy-Israel Association.

References

1971 births
People from the Province of Varese
Italian journalists
Italian male journalists
Politicians of Lombardy
Living people